Arnold Harris Mathew, self-styled  of Thomastown (7 August 1852 – 19 December 1919), was the founder and first bishop of the Old Roman Catholic Church in the United Kingdom and a noted author on ecclesiastical subjects.

Mathew had been both a Roman Catholic and an Anglican before becoming a bishop in the Union of Utrecht (UU).

Biography 

Mathew was born in the French Second Empire in 1852, son of Major Arnold Henry Ochterlony Mathew (originally Matthews, d. 1894; his son later claimed him to have been 3rd Earl Landaff). Major Mathew was son of Major Arnold Nesbit Mathew (originally Matthews), of the Indian Army, and his Italian wife, Contessa Eliza Francesca, daughter of Domenico Povoleri di Nagarole, a Marquis of the Papal State; through this descent the Rev. Arnold Mathew claimed the title of Count Povoleri di Vicenza. Major Arnold Nesbit Mathew was allegedly the son- born only five months after his parents' marriage- of the 1st Earl Landaff, sent to live with an uncle in light of the circumstances of his birth. This constituted the basis for the Rev. Arnold Mathew's claim to be 4th Earl Landaff, which would not come to be officially recognised. Research revealed the contemporary birth of an Arnold Nesbit Matthews to William Richard Matthews and his wife Anne at Down Ampney, Gloucestershire, which in conjunction with the Rev. Arnold Mathew's father and grandfather having originally been named 'Matthews' rather than 'Mathew', has been considered to cast sufficient doubt on the claim to descent from the Earls Landaff as to render it invalid.

Mathew was educated at Sedbergh School. Mathew was a relative of Theobald Mathew, the noted "Apostle of Temperance".

Mathew was baptised in the Roman Catholic Church. At age two, due to his mother's scruples, he was rebaptised in the Church of England. Mathew "went on oscillating between Rome and Canterbury for the rest of his life." He studied for the ministry in the Scottish Episcopal Church, but sought reconciliation and confirmation in the Church of Rome.

As a Roman Catholic, Mathew was ordained a priest in 1877 in St Andrew's Cathedral, Glasgow, Scotland, by Archbishop Charles Eyre, apostolic administrator of the Vicariate Apostolic of the Western District. Mathew received a Doctor of Divinity degree from Pope Pius IX. He became a Dominican in 1878 but only persevered a year, moving around a number of dioceses: Newcastle, Plymouth, Nottingham and Clifton. He had met Hyacinthe Loyson in France, while Mathew was, a missionary-rector in Bath where he apostatized in 1889 and sent an announcement to his congregation that having ceased to believe in the fundamental doctrines of Christianity he could no longer act as a priest. He lost faith in the biblical inspiration and in the divinity of Christ. After leaving Bath, he went to Paris to consult with people there. Later in 1891 he was persuaded to "trial" the Anglican ministry and went to assist the rector of Holy Trinity, Sloane Street, London. He was never officially received into the Church of England, neither did he formally leave the Roman Catholic Church.

In October 1890, he changed his name, by deed poll, from Arnold Jerome Matthews to Arnoldo Girolamo Povoleri. Mathew, under the name Povoleri, married Margaret Florence, fifth daughter of Robert Duncan, at St Marylebone Parish Church, London, on 22 February 1892. He was "described as a clerk in holy orders." They had a son, Francis Arnold Dominic Leo (b. 1900), who in light of his father's claimed title of Earl Landaff used the title 'Viscount Mathew' and served as a second lieutenant in the Indian Cavalry, and two daughters (Margherita Francesca, b. 1895, and Mary Teresa Gertrude, b. 1907).

He stopped using the name Povoleri in 1894. While his wife was listed in the 1897 Royal Blue Book as la Contessa Povoleri di Vicenza,
he stopped using the title of Count in 1894.

In 1897, Mathew had met Father Richard O'Halloran and became curious about the suggestion of an Old Catholic Church in Great Britain. In 1897, O'Halloran was suspended in the Roman Catholic Archdiocese of Westminster for "reasons of canonical discipline". O'Halloran condemned the censure and created the "Ealing schism". O'Halloran was, according to The Tablet, also suspected of heresy.

Election 

 bishops had corresponded with O'Halloran since 1902. O'Halloran believed that such a movement would interest a large number of disaffected Roman Catholics and Anglo-Catholics. In June 1906 the Royal Commission appointed in 1904 to inquire into "ecclesiastical disorders", afterwards known as the Ritual Commission. The king issued letters of business after the report. It was expected that the Catholic-minded Anglican clergy, with their congregations, might, by Act of Parliament, be forced out of the Anglican Communion. Persuaded by O'Halloran, Mathew joined the movement and was elected the first Regionary Old Catholic Bishop for Great Britain and in 1908 the Old Catholic Church of the Netherlands (OKKN) was petitioned to consecrate him to this charge.

Mathew's election was to some extent a precautionary endeavour by those anticipating a precipitate action by the Government regarding the Ritual Commission's findings, there were only a small number of Old Catholics in England. However, the King's Letters of Business dealing with the Report of the Ritual Commission received no further attention and no action was taken. The result was that those who had taken part in Mathew's election were able to remain within the Anglican Communion. In 1898 Willibald Beyschlag wrote, in The American Journal of Theology, that Old Catholic churches sought "federation with other churches having an" episcopal polity. They sought "recognition that they all belong to the one ecumenical church which rests upon the dogmatic and episcopal foundation of the early church, and can, therefore, practice communion with each other." Those negotiations had "no tangible result" in 1898, according to Beyschlag, who did not "think that such a result would be of any great value," because some Anglicans "emphatically desire to be 'catholic', and are at the same time wholly out of sympathy with the Old Catholics." Beyschlag distinguished that the Ritualist Anglican Catholics "are on the way to Rome; the Old Catholics on the way from Rome."

Consecration 

Mathew was consecrated in St. Gertrude's Cathedral, Utrecht, on 28 April 1908, by the  Archbishop Gerardus Gul of Utrecht, assisted by two  bishops, Jacobus Johannes van Thiel of Haarlem and Nicolaus Bartholomeus Petrus Spit of Deventer, and one Catholic Diocese of the Old Catholics in Germany bishop, Josef Demmel of Bonn.

Soon after the consecration, Mathew and O'Halloran were estranged and O'Halloran, under a pseudonym, questioned if the seventeen priests and the eight congregations did not exist in reality but were only a deception and if "the Old Catholic theology teaches that deception of any kind invalidates the consecration" then was Mathew "a validly consecrated Old Catholic bishop according to the teaching of Old Catholic theology?" Unprepared for the position in which he then found himself, Mathew informed Gul that he was himself a deceived victim and "the information given him by O'Halloran was entirely false" and offered to resign but his resignation was not accepted. Yet weeks earlier, Mathew and O'Halloran traveled to Utrecht where Mathew personally presented him to Gul. Within weeks, van Thiel wrote that the  "had no reason to suppose that we were mistaken in complying with" O'Halloran's request and stated that their "confidence in Bishop Mathew remains unshaken, after carefully perusing a large number of the documents bearing upon this matter," and they "earnestly hope that his ministrations will be abundantly blessed by Almighty God, and that he will receive the cordial support of the British people and Church in the trying circumstances in which he has been placed." Brandreth thought that the  "exonerated him from personal blame" in this letter. But Anson believed that it "was a polite way of stating that he had been consecrated under false pretenses, though not of his making."

The 1908 Lambeth Conference "deprecate[d] the setting up of a new organised body" and requested that Randall Davidson, Archbishop of Canterbury, notify the  bishops about the resolution. This was a protest against the consecration and although it was not publicized at the time, Gul replied with explanations and promised "that in future they 'would take care not to make trouble by encroaching on the order of a friendly Church'."

Mission in England 1908–1919 

Mathew published The Old Catholic Missal & Ritual in 1909, for Old Catholics using the English language.

In September 1909, he attended the Old Catholic Congress in Vienna, where he sympathized with the Dutch Old Catholics conservative position which opposed the innovations being introduced among the German and Swiss Old Catholics to renounce the Sacrament of Penance (auricular confession), the intercession of saints and alterations to the liturgy, including the omission of the Pope's name from the Canon of the Mass. He proposed the acceptance of the 1673 Synod of Jerusalem's doctrines. Mathew expressed fears that the trend of Continental Old Catholicism was towards Modernism, perhaps because of the growing association with Anglicans and Lutherans, and hoped for a return to the traditional principles of the Church of Utrecht. Moss wrote that Mathew thought they were becoming "steadily more Protestant". The  rejected Herford's request to join. Mathew, was needed for England. Mathew also rejected Herford's applications several times.

In October 1909, Mathew assisted Gul at the consecration of Jan Maria Michał Kowalski as archbishop of the Old Catholic Mariavite Church.

Beale and Howarth were suspended.

In August, van Thiel declared that Old Catholics "could not be considered responsible for [...] Mathew's eventual particular attitude or opinions, because he only represents his own clergy and himself in England." Mathew was "in no sense a representative of the Church of Holland in England." In December 1910,  concluded that Mathew had "given up communion with the other Old Catholics" when he acted against the Convention of Utrecht. He ignored "his duty to inform" the  prior to "any consecration", so "that the case may be duly examined and all precautions taken that no unworthy person be consecrated;" he consecrated men who belonged to another Church "knowing that they were Roman Catholics and would probably remain so"; he consecrated alone without need and in secret.

Autonomy and Independence 

On 7 January 1911, Mathew consecrated four men to the episcopate: Francis Herbert Bacon, Cuthbert Francis Hinton, William Edmond Scott-Hall, and Frederick Clement Christie Egerton.

An episcopal synod then followed and Mathew was unanimously elected Old Roman Catholic Archbishop of Great Britain and Ireland.

Although the Holy See usually did not respond to notifications about episcopal consecrations, in this case, on 11 February 1911, Pope Pius X excommunicated Beale, Howarth, and Mathew. The Times reported on their excommunication and included an English language translation of the Latin language document which described Mathew as a "pseudo-bishop". Mathew sued The Times for libel, on the grounds that the newspaper was apparently endorsing the Pope's characterization of him as a "pseudo-Bishop" who had given aid to a "wicked crime". Father David Fleming testified during the trial at the King's Bench Division in April 1913 that the three were excommunicated on the strength of their own communication to the Holy See.

The trial was described as "tense with laughter over the elaborate and convoluted ecclesiastical definitions." Mathew lost the case. A "material part of the case" about whether Mathew was truthful was the 1889 printed announcement sent to his congregation in Bath. The trial revealed that in 1897 Mathew restated that he had apostatized in 1889 and had circulated the printed announcement but by 1897 had concluded that his change in belief was a mistake; he therefore recanted the 1889 document, in 1897, which during the trial he said that he never wrote. He testified that he was hypnotized in Bath and so the announcement was written without his knowledge. Mathew's attorney argued that publication of the excommunication by The Times in English was high treason under a 1571 law re-enacted in 1846. The judge, Charles Darling, 1st Baron Darling, "held that it was not unlawful to publish a Papal Bull in a newspaper simply for the information of the public", and according to a 1932 article in The Tablet, this was the last time the 1571 act was invoked. The jury found that The Times had not been actuated by malice and the words of the report were true in substance and in fact.

A noted author and historian, Mathew had an excellent knowledge of the Eastern Orthodox Church and  Now an archbishop, Mathew was in contact with people interested in expanding the Eastern Orthodox Churches' presence in Western Europe. Olga Novikov, along with Baroness Natalie Uxkull-Gyllenband, encouraged and financially assisted Mathew and according to Anson, one of them also introduced Mathew to Greek Orthodox Church of Antioch Archbishop Gerassimos Messara, Metropolitan of Beirut.

On 5 August 1911, Messara, Legate of the Greek Orthodox Patriarch of Antioch, Mathew and others. After a long and full discussion the  Mathew was then solemnly received into the Greek Orthodox Church of Antioch by Messara and  Moss wrote that Messara "had no power to do this without the consent of" Gregory IV, in Damascus, "which was never given". According to Herzog, Gregory IV retracted Messara's statement. "It is hard to believe that an Orthodox Patriarch of Antioch would have been prepared to accept a married prelate into communion with his Church," Anson wrote. Mathew's wife "did not take part in the conference, and it is probable that her existence behind the scenes was again kept dark, as at the time of her husband's consecration in 1908." On 26 February 1912,  The Mathew v. "The Times" Publishing Co., Ltd. trial revealed that although Mathew "was originally informed that all were welcome, he was not ultimately admitted" as a cleric into the Greek Orthodox Church of Antioch. As   but bishops of a canonically autocephalous church in communion with two historical patriarchal sees of the ancient undivided Church.

Either Novikov or Uxkull-Gyllenband, according to Anson, introduced Mathew to Rudolph de Landas Berghes. By 1913 all six bishops which Mathew consecrated had separated from him, so he consecrated Berghes to continue his succession and initially to establish the ministry of the Old Roman Catholic Church in Scotland and then later in the United States. After Berghes emigrated to the U.S., Mathew consecrated Bernard Mary Williams, in 1916, and on 25 March 1917, Mathew appointed Williams as his successor.

Death 

Mathew wrote to The Tablet within a month:

Mathew retired to South Mimms, a village in the English countryside in Hertfordshire, and contented himself with assisting at services in a  parish church. He died suddenly, on 20 December 1919, at South Mimms and was buried in the churchyard at South Mimms.

Contemporary significance

Successor 

After Mathew's death, Bernard Mary Williams was the only bishop. Being now the only active Old Catholic in Great Britain, Williams considered safeguarding the succession. Being unwilling to see any repetition of the scandals of the past (the consecrations of undisclosed Theosophists resulting in the Liberal Catholic Church), he arrived at a mutual understanding with Carfora, that, should either die without leaving a successor, the survivor would consecrate a duly elected person to fill the vacancy.

In 1925, Williams issued a new constitution which repudiated the whole historical and doctrinal position of Old Roman Catholicism, the very position upon which Mathew had stood firm. By this constitution, he repudiated the objections of the Church of Utrecht to the Roman Church and renewed his acceptance of the canons and decrees of the Council of Trent, all with the aim of creating a pro-Roman rite and eventual reconciliation with the Church of Rome. Williams died on 9 June 1952 leaving no successor.

Groups descending from Mathew 

In 1964, Anson identified several independent sects which derived their apostolic succession through Mathew: the "Old Roman Catholic Church (Western Catholic Uniate Church)", "Old Catholic Church of Ireland", Liberal Catholic Church, "The Church Catholic", "Old Catholic Church in America", and the "North American Old Roman Catholic Church". He noted that, except for the Liberal Catholic Church, the "sects hardly counted numerically at all." Moss characterized, in 1948, that "there are several sects which claim to derive their episcopal succession from him, which are often confused with the Old Catholics, and which in some cases make use of the name 'Old Catholic'." But, Moss emphasized, "none of these sects is Old Catholic, or is recognized in any way by the genuine Old Catholic churches in communion with the Archbishop of Utrecht."

There are many independent churches, "rites" and ecclesiastic bodies in the English speaking world, particularly in North America and some in Continental Europe which trace derive their apostolic succession through Mathew. This makes Mathew a significant figure in the Independent Sacramental Movement. However, genuine Old Roman Catholic jurisdictions directly descended from the missionary endeavours of the first generation of Mathew's bishops are very few.

Mathew's activities as a bishop gave birth to the Liberal Catholic Church and the more conservative Old Roman Catholic churches, which are autocephalous churches holding to a traditional Roman Catholic worship style, most rejecting the dogmas of the First Vatican Council but some offering nominal acceptance.

Old Roman Catholic Church 

 the only global Old Roman Catholic jurisdiction with provinces in North America, South America, Asia and Africa] and the Old Roman Catholic Church in Great Britain (ORCC/GB) headed by Archbishop Douglas Lewins, who claims to be the lineal descendant of Mathew's original church.

In the United States, as well as the Old Roman Catholic Church Latin Rite (ORCC/LR), the following are  the only churches descended directly from the Old Roman Catholic Church of North America founded by Landas Berghes succeeded by Carfora, namely the Old Roman Catholic Church: See of Caer-Glow (ORCC/SoG) headed by Archbishop John Humphreys; the Old Roman Catholic Church in North America (ORCCNA) headed by Archbishop Francis P. Facione; the North American Old Roman Catholic Church (NAORCC) headed by Archbishop Edward J. Ford; the North American Old Roman Catholic Church (NAORCC) headed by Archbishop Theodore Rematt and the North American Old Roman Catholic Church – Utrecht Succession, Archdiocese of California (NAORCC) headed by Archbishop Joseph A. Vellone.
There are other churches using the name "Old Roman Catholic" that have no direct connection to the above jurisdictions and are not directly descended from the original Old Roman Catholic missions. Such churches' claims to being Old Roman Catholic are usually by virtue of having attained Mathew's succession from various episcopi vagantes or by adopting the polity of Old Roman Catholicism.

Liberal Catholic Church 

Mathew was a traditional Ultrajectine and Roman Catholic in his religious beliefs and believed the bishops he consecrated were orthodox in their theology as well, preaching doctrines common to the Roman Catholic and Anglican churches.

Anson wrote that, for at least two years, Mathew was "in close touch with leading Theosophists, apparently without investigating the orthodoxy of their beliefs," and believed that Mathew "had no excuse" for not understanding the cult of Maitreya beliefs held by the majority of his clergy. The manifestations of Maitreya included the Hindu deity Krishna and Christ during the three years of the ministry of Jesus. Nicholas Goodrick-Clarke wrote, in Constructing Tradition, that the identification of Christ as Maitreya was Charles Webster Leadbeater's "innovation, closely linked to his assimilation of Christianity to Theosophy." According to Catholic Encyclopedia, theosophy "is a form of pantheism and denies a personal God," and pantheism is simply atheism. According to Anson, the majority of clergy involved with Mathew were members of the Theosophical Society and the Order of the Star in the East (OSE), and were dismayed when Mathew directed them to separate from these organizations in 1915. Instead, within weeks, they had separated from Mathew and elected Rupert Gauntlett, secretary of the Theosophical Society's Order of Healers, and Robert King, a consulting psychic and astrologer, to the episcopate.

But the "effective leader of the schism" was James Ingall Wedgwood. Mathew ordained Wedgwood as a priest in 1913. In 1916 Frederick Samuel Willoughby, who had been consecrated by Mathew, consecrated Gauntlett, King, and Wedgwood.
Leadbeater wrote to Annie Besant, in 1916, that Wedgwood offered Mathew's Old Catholic movement to Maitreya, one of the Great White Brotherhood's ascended masters and holder of the office of World Teacher, "as one of the vehicles for [... Maitreya's] force, and a channel for the preparation of His Coming." Leadbeater took Wedgwood during a festival in Sydney to make that offering. Leadbeater promoted an unorthodox esoteric understanding of Christian creeds; he interpreted Christian doctrines through Theosophy. Leadbeater and Wedgwood revised The Old Catholic Missal and Ritual, by "eliminating references to fear of God, everlasting damnation, the insistence on sinfulness and appeals for mercy," according to Joanne Pearson, in Wicca and the Christian Heritage. Later that year, before the end of World War I, the schism which separated from Mathew's group was renamed the Liberal Catholic Church (LCC) and Wedgwood became the first presiding bishop. Leadbeater informed Besant that Maitreya approved of the  founding. The  "affirms a number of Christian beliefs but injects a Gnostic or theosophical meaning into them," according to Encyclopedia of Occultism and Parapsychology. "The church believes that humans are sparks of divinity (rather than creatures of God) and believes in reincarnation (rather than resurrection). The church also accepts the idea of the spiritual hierarchy of masters, or highly evolved beings who guide the spiritual development of the race. In this regard, it accepts the idea that Jesus is one of the masters, but separates the human Jesus [...] from the master Jesus." In other words, Jesus, "the person known in his early life as Appolonius of Tyanna" in that system of beliefs, is not the same as the entity known as Maitreya in that same system beliefs.

The  self identifies as a part of the historical Catholic Church; has doctrines but does not regulate how they are believed by congregants, unlike Roman Catholic dogma; and has membership based on acceptance of a common worship without the profession of a common belief.

Validity 

Utrecht denial 

After Mathew died in 1919, the  declared in 1920 that Mathew's "consecration was obtained  and that consequently it is null and void."
The suggestion was that the petition for his consecration and its 150 signatories collated by O'Halloran was false in its premise for the consecration and thus the consecration was invalid.

However, Mathew had disclosed the matter fully to the Dutch bishops days after the consecration when it transpired that the Anglicans who had participated in his election withdrew from the petition due to the changed situation regarding the Ritual Commission (see above).

The  bishops inquired into the circumstances and Mathew was publicly exonerated from all suggestion of misrepresentation in a letter to The Guardian of 3 June 1908, the bishops also refused Mathew's request to retire. Also, on 5 October 1909, Mathew assisted Gul together with Thiel, Demmel, and Spit at Kowalski's consecration, so clearly there was no suggestion of mala fides or "invalidity" then by the Old Catholic bishops.

(though recently ).

He wrote that a surreptitious consecration, under false pretenses and on presentation of false documents, can not be recognized as valid, even if the rite of ordination had been accurately performed by real bishops.

In 1908, Lambeth had expressed regret over the consecration of Mathew.
Lambeth also indicated a desire for a closer relationship with Utrecht.
  Randall Davidson, Archbishop of Canterbury, and William Maclagan, Archbishop of York, replied to the Holy See in Saepius officio giving a defence of Anglican orders.
Discussions about union with Utrecht had been taking place since the end of the 19th century,
such as the conferences of reunion in Bonn in 1874 and 1875 convoked by Johann von Döllinger. Though the Dutch bishops in a report of 1894 still could not decide on the recognition of Anglican orders.It would appear that a desire for closer cooperation on the part of Utrecht with an Anglican desire for the recognition of their orders, conspired to impugn the reputation of Mathew.

 which relies solely on the ceremony and intentions of the consecrating bishops rather than on any external circumstances.

As the ceremony took place and no-one questioned the intentions of the bishops involved,
according to sacramental theology and canonical principles,
 "…an act, especially one as solemn as an ordination, must be regarded as valid, as long as invalidity would not be clearly demonstrated."

Rite 

Old Roman Catholic jurisdictions have consistently employed the Tridentine Ordinal and Roman Pontifical for the conferral of ordinations and the consecration of bishops. This was the case with the See of Utrecht right up to and some years beyond the consecration of Mathew himself, without any alterations to the ceremonies. Mathew's Old Catholic Missal & Ritual contains his English translation of the Roman Pontifical; and, either this or the original Latin is used in all Old Roman Catholic ceremonies still to this day, even by those jurisdictions who permit modern liturgies for the Mass.

"A priest or bishop who confers a sacrament doesn't have to 'prove' that he intends to do what the Church does. He is automatically presumed to intend what the rite means. This is certain theological doctrine, taught by the Church. And to deny it is 'theologically rash'," according to Cekada.

"Schismatic" or "excommunicate" ordinations 

According to Cekada, Traditionalist Catholics sometimes assert that "without a papal dispensation, an episcopal consecration performed without two priest-assistants is doubtful". Using the 1917 Code of Canon Law but not the current 1983 Code of Canon Law which replaced it, he argued against this assertion and stated that "no law or canonist supports this" and reasoned that "teachings of the canonists directly contradict it too". Cekada quoted Marie Dominique Bouix, who wrote: "Even if there should be a consecration without any assistants and without obtaining a pontifical dispensation, it would still be valid." Cekada wrote that Eduardo Regatillo's writing "goes even further. He [Regatillo] says that a consecration performed without a dispensation would be valid even if the bishop 'is the only one who is present at the consecration';" and that, "Pope Alexander VII, Pope Clement XI and Pope Benedict XIV declared that consecrations performed without such a dispensation are valid."

Sometimes, it is asserted that, because Mathew was excommunicated by Pius X, anyone ordained or consecrated by him thereafter incurs the same penalty.

"Penalties aren't 'contagious'", according to Cekada, even if a bishop "had personally incurred excommunication, it would not be incurred by clergy who derive their orders from him"; he wrote that the  states: "It is not permitted to extend penalties from person to person or from case to case, even though the reason is the same or even stronger."
"Receiving orders from an excommunicate incurs only suspension", wrote Cekada, which prohibits "licitly exercising orders".

Furthermore, the  states that "Except as provided in § 3, the faithful can for any just cause ask for sacraments or sacramentals of one who is excommunicated, especially if there is no one else to give them; and in such cases the excommunicated person so asked may administer them, and is not obliged to ask the reason for the request."

No Old Roman Catholic bishops have been declared  since Mathew. Thus as his excommunication is not contagious, this scenario does not apply.

Licit or illicit 

It is also suggested that such orders are "illicit", i.e. non-canonical.

Gul consecrated and commissioned Mathew as a bishop in accordance with the norms of universal ecclesiastical law, nominating and electing him to a title.

Affirmations of validity 

There are instances where Old Roman Catholic orders have been affirmed by theologians, canonists and even representatives of the Holy See.

In 1915, Berghes participated in the Protestant Episcopal Church in the United States of America (PECUSA) consecration of Hiram Richard Hulse.
  Anglican Communion bishops stated in 1920 Lambeth Conference resolution 27 and 1958 Lambeth Conference resolution 54 that they do not regard the Old Catholic Church in Great Britain, its extensions overseas, and  who call themselves either 'Old Catholic' or 'Orthodox,' in combination with other names" "as properly constituted Churches, or recognise the orders of their ministers."

The Roman Catholic Archdiocese of Quebec, in a public statement, which included an apology made for miscategorizing Father Claude Lacroix, acknowledged the validity of Lacroix's holy orders and stated that 's certificates of baptism "may be accepted for the inscription of children to First Communion and Confirmation program" in the Roman Catholic Archdiocese of Quebec. It also stated that when "Roman Catholics marry before an ordained minister belonging to another religious denomination, as in the case of the [... ], their marriage is invalid from a religious point of view."

In 2002, Cardinal Édouard Gagnon investigated the documentation of Bishop André Letellier's episcopal orders and consecration. Letellier was consecrated on 23 May 1968 by Archbishop André Leon Zotique Barbeau of the Catholic Charismatic Church of Canada. Gagnon commented that, "nothing allows me to doubt the validity of episcopal ordination of Mgr André Letellier by Archbishop André Barbeau and that of Archbishop Barbeau by Archbishop Ignatius Charles Brearley, Primate of the Church of the 'Old Catholics' having its seat in England. The ordinations of the 'Old Catholics' are generally considered to be the same as those of Orthodox bishops."

In 1913, Fleming testified in Mathew v. "The Times" Publishing Co., Ltd. about the  that, "The Holy See or the Pontiff has never condemned these orders as invalid; but he has never explicitly recognized them."

Publications

Further reading

Notes and references

Notes

References 

Mathew, Arnold Harris
Mathew, Arnold Harris
Mathew, Arnold Harris
Mathew, Arnold
Former Roman Catholics
Former Anglicans
Arnold